Tuckey is an English surname. Notable people with the surname include:

Agnes Tuckey (1877–1972), English tennis player
Brent Tuckey (born 1979), Australian footballer
C Tuckey ( 1924), Australian footballer and rugby player
Charles Lloyd Tuckey (1854–1925), English physician
Dick Tuckey (1913–1974), American football player
Hobart Tuckey (1884–1951), Australian politician
James Hingston Tuckey (1776–1816), British explorer and navy captain
Kay Tuckey ( 1921–2016), English tennis player
Len Tuckey (born 1945), English musician 
Raymond Tuckey (1910–2005), English tennis player
Tom Tuckey (1884–1950), American baseball player
William Tuckey (1708–1781), English-American composer
Wilson Tuckey (born 1935), Australian politician

English-language surnames